The Los Angeles County Department of Parks and Recreation is an agency of the County of Los Angeles which oversees its parks and recreational facilities. It was created in 1944.

It maintains 183 parks and operates the world’s largest municipal golf course system with 20 courses. It also owns the Hollywood Bowl and the John Anson Ford Amphitheatre.

Weddings can be held at the Los Angeles County Arboretum and Botanic Garden in Arcadia, Descanso Gardens in La Canada Flintridge, South Coast Botanic Garden on the Palos Verdes Peninsula, and Magic Johnson Park in Willowbrook. Virginia Robinson Gardens is open for tours.

It operates nature centers at:
 Deane Dana Friendship Park and Nature Center
 Devil's Punchbowl Natural Area
 Eaton Canyon Park & Nature Center
  Placerita Canyon Nature Center
 San Dimas Canyon Nature Center
 Santa Catalina Island Interpretive Center
 Santa Fe Dam Recreation Area
 Stoneview Nature Center, Baldwin Hills
 Vasquez Rocks Natural Area Park
 Whittier Narrows Nature Center

It has fishing lakes at:
 Alondra Community Regional Park
 Apollo Community Regional Park
 Belvedere Community Regional Park
 Frank G. Bonelli Regional Park
 Castaic Lake State Recreation Area
 Cerritos Community Regional Park
 Kenneth Hahn State Recreation Area
 Earvin "Magic" Johnson Park
 La Mirada Community Regional Park
 Santa Fe Dam Recreation Area
 Whittier Narrows Recreation Area

The Department hosts approximately 300 film projects a year, including feature films, television series, television commercials, and still photography shoots for various magazines and publications.

Safety and law enforcement services are provided on a contract basis from the Los Angeles County Sheriff's Department's Parks Bureau.  Prior to 2010, the Los Angeles County Office of Public Safety (County Police) and its predecessor agencies were responsible for law enforcement in the county parks.

Management and Commission
Since 2020, the director is Norma Edith García-Gonzalez. The department is governed by a five member commission, appointed by the Los Angeles County Board of Supervisors.

References

External links
 

Parks
County government agencies in California
County parks departments in the United States
Organizations based in Los Angeles County, California